The Wisconsin Interscholastic Athletic Association (WIAA) is the regulatory body for all high school sports in Wisconsin. Its history dates to 1895, making it the earliest continually existing high school athletic organization in the country. It also provides the licensing program for more than 10,000 officials in the state, and oversees junior high or middle school athletics in about 100 of the state's nearly 400 school districts. Among its duties are the administration of state tournament series in its various sports, overseeing eligibility and conference alignment, and promoting sportsmanship.

History

The WIAA considers its start to be a meeting in December 1896 of part of the state teachers association following a state track and field meet organized by the University of Wisconsin–Madison. Meetings led to the formation of a rules committee, followed by a Board of Control, which is still the WIAA's governing board. It has 11 members, seven chosen by regions, three at-large and a representative from the Wisconsin Association of School Boards. An Advisory Council, made up of 18 members, also provides governance and advice. It is made up of 15 members, five each from large, medium and small schools, a gender at-large representative, a minority at-large representative and a nonpublic school representative.

Until 2000, only public schools were WIAA members. Private schools had belonged to the Wisconsin Independent Schools Athletic Association. When that organization announced it would shut down, the WIAA changed its rules to allow private schools. The WIAA, unlike some other states, does not add a multiplier to enrollment of private schools to contend with perceived advantages private schools have in drawing athletes.

The WIAA held its own state track meet in 1897 and its first state boys' basketball tournament in 1920. For boys' sports, it added cross country (1913), golf (1923), tennis (1925), and swimming (1925). In the 1940s, wrestling (1940), volleyball (1948) and baseball (1948) were added; in the 1950s, skiing and curling, and in the 1960s, gymnastics. These sports have been dropped by the WIAA. 1965 also brought a second baseball tournament, this one for summer participants, which was dropped after the 2018 season due to dwindling participation. Ice hockey was added in 1970, Soccer (1982) was added, and volleyball, which had been dropped (in 1982), returned to tournament status in 2000.

Football was a recognized sport but championships were only held briefly in the 1920s. The WIAA resumed playoffs in 1976.

The WIAA started adding girls sports in the 1970s. Swimming (1970) was the first, followed by gymnastics, track, and tennis in 1971, golf (1972), and volleyball (1973). Cross country joined the list in 1975, then basketball and softball (1976). Girls' soccer added a state tournament in 1983. The most recent addition was ice hockey in 2002.

Sports offered
The number of classes - referred to as divisions by the WIAA, and numbered so that 1 includes the largest schools while higher numbers include smaller schools - varies by sport. Except for football, all schools sponsoring a sport are in the tournament. Seeding is used for matchups in several team sports and in individual sports. The tournament structure starts with multi-team regionals, usually at the site of one school, followed by sectionals, usually at a neutral site (unless a team in the regional gets to a sectional it is hosting), and then state.
Cross country — There are three divisions for both boys' and girls' cross country. The championships are held at The Ridges Golf Course in Wisconsin Rapids.
Girls' volleyball — There are four divisions. The championships are held at the Resch Center in Green Bay.
Boys' volleyball — There is one division. Finals are held at Wisconsin Lutheran College in Milwaukee.
Baseball — There are four divisions. The WIAA State Baseball Championships are held at Fox Cities Stadium in Grand Chute.
Gymnastics — There are two divisions. Championships are held at Lincoln High School in Wisconsin Rapids.
Basketball — Both boys' and girls' basketball have five divisions. The boys' championships are held at the Kohl Center in Madison, or the Alliant Energy Center or Wisconsin Field House in years where the Kohl Center hosts NCAA basketball tournament regionals at the same time. The girls' championships are held at the Resch Center in Green Bay.
Football — There are seven divisions. Teams must have a .500 conference record or better to qualify for the state tournament. There are seven 32 team playoffs, with all championship games held at Camp Randall Stadium in Madison the week before Thanksgiving.
Wrestling — There are three divisions. Individuals championships are held at the Kohl Center in Madison, while team state championships are held at the University Field House in Madison. Regionals serve both individual and team competitions, with the team winning the regional going to the team sectional including all of its members, whether they qualified for the individual sectional or not.
Ice hockey — Both boys' and girls' have one division. The championships are held at Alliant Energy Center in Madison.
Track and field — There are three divisions in both boys' and girls' track and field. The championships are held at Veterans Memorial Stadium in La Crosse.
Soccer - Both boys' and girls' soccer have four divisions. The state tournament is held at Uhlein Soccer Park in Milwaukee.
Softball — There are five divisions. The state tournament is held at Goodman Diamond in Madison.
Swimming - There are two divisions. The state meet is held at the University of Wisconsin Natatorium in Madison.
Golf - There are two divisions in girls golf and three divisions for boys. Both championships are held at University Ridge Golf Course in Madison since 1994.
Tennis - There are two divisions for both boys and girls tennis. Championships are held at Nielsen Stadium in Madison.

Conferences

The WIAA added overseeing of athletic conferences to its duties in the 1980s after several disputes. Previously, schools had banded together on their own. The WIAA's role is to keep conferences consisting of similar-sized schools within a reasonable distance of each other. Except for football, conference championships do not have any effect on a team's tournament seeding.

Cooperative teams
In 1982, the WIAA approved cooperative teams, allowing two or more schools to combine to form a team in a sport where neither school has enough athletes to run the sport on its own. The schools are generally referred to by a hyphenated version of their school names, although some choose a unique team nickname and mascot. The schools involved must be in the same geographical area and combine for at least two years, although the WIAA may approve an early release. In addition, the conference the combined team will compete in must approve. The total enrollment of the two schools determines which tournament division the team plays in.

The rule has allowed smaller schools to combine for sports such as football and track which require larger numbers, and larger schools to combine for sports with low interest.

References

External links
Official site

High school sports associations in the United States
Sports organizations established in 1895
High school sports in Wisconsin
1895 establishments in Wisconsin